In Greek mythology, Pyrrha (Ancient Greek: Πύρρα) was the daughter of Epimetheus and Pandora and wife of Deucalion of whom she had three sons, Hellen, Amphictyon, Orestheus; and three daughters Protogeneia, Pandora II and Thyia. According to some accounts, Hellen or Helmetheus was credited to be born from Pyrrha's union with Zeus.

Etymology 
In Latin, the word pyrrhus means red from the Greek adjective πυρρός, purrhos, i.e. "flame coloured", "the colour of fire", "fiery red" or simply "red" or "reddish". Pyrrha was evidently named after her red hair as Horace and Ovid describe her as red haired.

Mythology 

When Zeus decided to end the Bronze Age with the great deluge, Pyrrha and her husband, Deucalion, were the only survivors.  Even though he was imprisoned, Prometheus who could see the future and had foreseen the coming of this flood told his son, Deucalion, to build an ark and, thus, they survived.  During the flood, they landed on Mount Parnassus, the only place spared by the flood.

Once the deluge was over and the couple were on land again, Deucalion consulted the oracle of Themis about how to repopulate the earth. He was told to throw the bones of his mother behind his shoulder. Deucalion and Pyrrha understood the "mother" to be Gaia, the mother of all living things, and the "bones" to be rocks. They threw the rocks behind their shoulders, which soon began to lose their hardness and change form.  Their mass grew greater, and the beginnings of human form emerged.  The parts that were soft and moist became skin, the veins of the rock became people's veins, and the hardest parts of the rocks became bones.  The stones thrown by Pyrrha became women;  those thrown by Deucalion became men.

The story of Deucalion and Pyrrha is also retold in the Roman poet Ovid’s famous collection Metamorphoses. In this retelling, Jove (the Roman equivalent of Zeus) takes pity on the couple, recognizing them to be devout worshipers. He parts the clouds and ends the deluge specifically to save Deucalion and Pyrrha, who are floating aimlessly on a raft. When the storm has cleared and the waters have subsided, Deucalion and Pyrrha are taken aback by the desolate wreckage of the land, and understand that they are now responsible for repopulating the earth. Confused on how to carry out their destiny, they go to see the goddess Themis. Themis tells Pyrrha that she must cast the bones of her mother to successfully reproduce. Pyrrha is distraught at the idea of desecrating her mother’s honor by digging up her bones, but Deucalion correctly reasons that Themis is referring to great mother earth, as Themis would never advise someone to commit a crime. Both Pyrrha and Deucalion throw a stone over their shoulder – Pyrrha’s turning into a woman, Deucalion’s turning into a man.

Once the land has been repopulated with humans, mother earth follows suit and begins to produce all other forms of life. Ovid uses this opportunity to inform his audience that heat and water are the sources of all life, "because when heat and moisture blend in due balance, they conceive: these two, these are the origin of everything. Though fire and water fight, humidity and warmth create all things; that harmony". (Ovid – p 15).

Genealogy of Hellenes

See also
Noah's ark

Note

References 

 Apollodorus, The Library with an English Translation by Sir James George Frazer, F.B.A., F.R.S. in 2 Volumes, Cambridge, MA, Harvard University Press; London, William Heinemann Ltd. 1921. ISBN 0-674-99135-4. Online version at the Perseus Digital Library. Greek text available from the same website.
Graves, Robert, The Greek Myths: The Complete and Definitive Edition. Penguin Books Limited. 2017. 
Pseudo-Clement, Recognitions from Ante-Nicene Library Volume 8, translated by Smith, Rev. Thomas. T. & T. Clark, Edinburgh. 1867. Online version at theio.com
 Publius Ovidius Naso, Metamorphoses translated by Brookes More (1859-1942). Boston, Cornhill Publishing Co. 1922. Online version at the Perseus Digital Library.
 Publius Ovidius Naso, Metamorphoses. Hugo Magnus. Gotha (Germany). Friedr. Andr. Perthes. 1892. Latin text available at the Perseus Digital Library.
 Quintus Horatius Flaccus, The Odes and Carmen Saeculare of Horace. Edition by John Conington. London. George Bell and Sons. 1882. Online version at the Perseus Digital Library.
 Quintus Horatius Flaccus, Odes and Epodes. Edition by Paul Shorey and Gordon J. Laing. Chicago. Benj. H. Sanborn & Co. 1919. Latin text available at the Perseus Digital Library.

External links
Phyrrha, Three translations in English
The Library of Greek Mythology (Apollodorus), translated by Robin Hard
Ovid Metamorphoses (new translation by A. D. Medville (2009))


Legendary progenitors
Queens in Greek mythology
Mortal women of Zeus
Thessalian characters in Greek mythology
Thessalian mythology
Deeds of Zeus
Flood myths